This microRNA database and microRNA targets databases is a compilation of databases and web portals and servers used for microRNAs and their targets. MicroRNAs (miRNAs) represent an important class of small non-coding RNAs (ncRNAs) that regulate gene expression by targeting messenger RNAs.

microRNA target gene databases

microRNA databases

References

Further reading

External links 
 starBase database
 StarScan tool
 Cupid: simultaneous reconstruction of microRNA-target and ceRNA networks
 miRBase database
 deepBase database
 TargetScan
 picTar
 miRecords database
 TarBase database
 Target ID Library
 miRTarBase database
 MBSTAR tool

RNA
MicroRNA
Genetics databases